Great Mail Robbery is a 1927 American silent drama film directed by George B. Seitz. This film survives in the Library of Congress collection incomplete.

Cast
 Theodore von Eltz as Lieutenant Donald Macready
 Frank Nelson as Sergeant Bill Smith
 Jeanne Morgan as Laura Phelps
 Lee Shumway as Philip Howard
 DeWitt Jennings as Captain Davis
 Cora Williams as Mrs. Davis
 Nelson McDowell as Sheriff
 Charles Hill Mailes as Stephen Phelps
 Yvonne Howell as Sally

References

External links

1927 films
1927 crime drama films
American drama films
American silent feature films
Films directed by George B. Seitz
American black-and-white films
Film Booking Offices of America films
1920s American films
Silent American drama films